Big Bay may refer to:

 Big Bay, British Columbia, Canada
 Big Bay, Michigan, United States
 Big Bay (New Zealand), New Zealand
 Big Bay, Espiritu Santo, Vanuatu
 Big Bay Short Range Radar Site, Canada

See also
 Big Bay Dam
 Big Bay State Park
 Big Wave Bay (disambiguation)
 Little Bay (disambiguation)
 Tai Wan, literally "Big Bay"